Camilus Christopher Alexander (born 20 October 1981) is a Grenadian cricketer who has played for the Windward Islands in West Indian domestic cricket. He plays as a right-arm leg-spin bowler.

Alexander was born in Mount Horne, in Grenada's Saint Andrew Parish. Aged 17, he represented the West Indies under-19s at the 2000 World Cup, playing in three of his team's seven matches. Alexander's best performance at the tournament was 3/49 against New Zealand. He made his first-class debut a few months later, playing a single match for the West Indies under-23s against the touring Pakistanis. In the 2000–01 and 2001–02 editions of the Busta Cup, Alexander played for West Indies B, a development team. He also played a single match for the Southern Windward Islands in the 2001–02 Red Stripe Bowl, a limited-overs competition.

Between March 2002 and February 2009, Alexander played only a single match of first-class cricket, appearing for the Windward Islands against the Leeward Islands in the 2004–05 Carib Beer Cup. However, he did represent the Grenadian national team at the 2008 Stanford 20/20 tournament, playing against Anguilla and Barbados. Alexander was eventually recalled to the Windwards squad for the 2008–09 Regional Four Day Competition. In three matches, he failed to take a single wicket, although he did score 62 against Guyana (his only first-class half-century. He had come to crease as a nightwatchman at the end of the second day, following the dismissal of opener Johnson Charles.

In March 2017, he was called up to a selection camp with the potential of representing the United States at the 2017 ICC World Cricket League Division Three tournament.

References

External links
Player profile and statistics at CricketArchive
Player profile and statistics at ESPNcricinfo

1981 births
Living people
Grenadian cricketers
People from Saint Andrew Parish, Grenada
West Indies B cricketers
Windward Islands cricketers